The Bodoland Territorial Council (BTC) is an autonomous council for the Bodoland Territorial Region established under 6th Schedule of The Constitution of India according to the Memorandum of Settlement between Bodoland Liberation Tiger Force (BLTF) and Government of India and Government of Assam.

The BTC has 40 elected members and an additional six members that are appointed by the Governor of Assam. The area under the BTC jurisdiction is officially called the Bodoland Territorial Area District (BTAD). The region falls within the geographical map of the least developed region in India. The agro-based economy is the only source of livelihood of the people. Industrialisation and other employment opportunities are scant.

The Bodoland Territorial Council is headed by a Speaker and the executive committee is chaired by a Chief Executive Member, currently Pramod Boro.

The BTC consists of five contiguous districts — Kokrajhar, Baksa, Udalguri, Chirang, Tamulpur — carved out of seven existing districts — Kokrajhar, Bongaigaon, Barpeta, Nalbari, Kamrup, Darrang and Sonitpur — an area of 8970 km2 (11% of Assam land area i.e. 78,438  km2) comprising various protected tribal belts and blocks in Assam. Its establishment was under the Amended Sixth Schedule of the Constitution of India.

History 
The BTC was constituted in 2003 and the first elections were held in 2005.

Powers and competencies

Executive and legislative powers

The executive and legislative powers of the Bodoland Territorial Council are derived from the provisions of the Sixth Schedule of the Constitution of India and the 2003 and 2020 Bodoland Peace Agreements.

The powers and competencies of the council are as follows:

 Cottage Industry
 Animal Husbandry and Veterinary
 Forestry & Wild life
 Climate Change
 Agriculture
 Public Works
 Silk Industry
 Soil Conservation
 Co-operatives 
 Fisheries
 Handlooms and Textiles
 Health and Family Welfare
 Public Health Engineering
 Irrigation
 Social Welfare & Nutrition
 Flood control schemes
 Sports and Youth Welfare
 Weights and Measures
 Library Services
 Museums and Archaeology
 Urban Development and Town and Country Planning
 Tribal Research Institute
 Education
 Land and Land Revenue
 Public Relations
 Printing and Stationery
 Tourism
 Transport
 Urban Development 
 Dairy Development 
 Municipal Corporations
 Village administration
 Tribal Welfare
 Welfare of SCs, OBCs, Tea Tribes and Minority
 Markets and Fairs
 Lotteries, Theatres, Dramatic Performance and Cinemas
 Registration of Births and Deaths
 Food Processing 
 Intoxicating liquors and opium and derivatives
 Renewable Energy
 Cultural Affairs
 Industry
 Legal Metrology
 Skill Development and Entrepreneurship
 Excise
 Horticulture 
 Science and Technology 
 Farmers Welfare 
 AYUSH
 Social Justice & Empowerment
 Welfare of Tea Tribes
 Economic and Statistics
 Traditional Skill Development 
 Food and Civil Supplies
 Consumer Affairs
 Welfare of Bodoland
 Labour and Employment including Industrial Training Institutes

Revenue and taxation

The Bodoland Territorial Council to levy taxes, fees and tolls on; buildings and land, animals, vehicles, boats, entry of goods into the area, roads, ferries, bridges, sanitation, employment and income and general taxes for the maintenance of schools and roads.

Composition
No party has won a majority in the elections in the December 2020 council election with BPF emerging as the single largest party. On 13 December 2020, the UPPL, BJP and GSP agreed to form the next executive.

Party summary

Members
Executive power is vested in an Executive Committee led by the Chief Executive Member.

However, between April 2020 and December 2020, all executive and legislative functions were exercised by a principal secretary acting on behalf of the Governor of Assam. In April 2020, Siddharth Singh has been appointed as the Principal Secretary of Bodoland Territorial Council, while Rajesh Prasad was posted as the administrator.

Membership (2020-2025 session)

Executive Committee 

The leader of the UPPL, Pramod Boro, became the new Chief Executive Member of the Bodoland Territorial Council on 15 December 2020 with Gobinda Basumatary becoming the Deputy Chief Executive. Subsequently, a new twelve member executive committee was formed with eight members from the United People's Party Liberal, seven members from the Bharatiya Janata Party and one member from the Gana Suraksha Party. But in mid 2021,GSP left NDA and started talks with TMC.

See also
 2020 Bodoland Territorial Council election
 2015 Bodoland Territorial Council election
 Bodo Kachari Welfare Autonomous Council
 Autonomous regions of India
 Bodoland

References

Bodoland
Autonomous regions of India